Taniela Rainibogi is a Fijian weightlifter. He participated at the 2022 Commonwealth Games in the weightlifting competition, being awarded the bronze medal in the men's 96 kg event.

Rainibogi was the first person to win a medal in the weightlifting competition. He and Helen Seipua qualified to participate at the 2022 Commonwealth Games. Rainibogi had previously won a bronze and silver medal at the 2017 Oceania Weightlifting Championships.

References

External links 

Living people
Place of birth missing (living people)
Year of birth missing (living people)
Fijian male weightlifters
Weightlifters at the 2022 Commonwealth Games
Commonwealth Games bronze medallists for Fiji
Commonwealth Games medallists in weightlifting
Medallists at the 2022 Commonwealth Games